William Randolph Wintergreen is a fictional character appearing in comic books published by DC Comics, often depicted as an associate of Slade Wilson (the supervillain Deathstroke). Although Wintergreen lacked Slade's superhuman physical attributes, he possessed far more combat experience and thus acted as Wilson's mentor.

A re-imagined version of the character appeared on The CW's live-action television series Arrow in the first season, where he was portrayed by stunt performer Jeffrey C. Robinson as the show's first incarnation of Deathstroke. He returned in the final season as well. He was also featured on the second season of the DC Universe series Titans, played by Demore Barnes.

Publication history
Created by George Pérez and Marv Wolfman, William Randolph Wintergreen was introduced to the DC Universe in The New Teen Titans #2 (December 1980) as the butler of Deathstroke the Terminator.

Fictional character biography
William Randolph Wintergreen grew up in Oxford, England. At university, he avoided sports and squirreled himself away in the library, which was open to him due to his father's title. He possessed strong research skills, and knowing the conduits through which information flowed later aided him in his work with MI5. Wintergreen met Sergeant Slade Wilson during his time at the British Army, and the two developed a close friendship. When General Sampson sent Slade on a suicide mission, Wintergreen, now a member of the Special Air Service, rescued Slade from perishing in an explosion, while Sampson was given a minor reprimand. Wintergreen served as Slade's best man when the latter married his captain, Adeline Kane. Still holding a grudge for Wintergreen's disobedience, Sampson later sent Wintergreen on a suicide mission. Slade commandeered a plane and made his way to Hanoi, where he freed Wintergreen from a Viet Cong prison. Slade then revealed to Wintergreen that his physical attributes had been enhanced by a military experiment. Slade was subsequently discharged for disobeying orders to save Wintergreen.

Following his discharge, Slade secretly began operating as the mercenary "Deathstroke". When Slade's occupation resulted in an accident involving their son, Joseph Wilson, Adeline divorced Slade and left with their children. Wintergreen then became Slade's butler and mentor, acting as his moral conscience, comrade in arms and medic. Wintergreen also began cataloguing Slade's adventures in journal entries. Slade took up hunting in Africa for a brief time, with Wintergreen at his side. Slade eventually returned to his mercenary ways, and Wintergreen continued to catalogue his missions. Slade later discovered that he had a daughter named Rose Wilson. Fearing that he would not be a good father, Slade left Rose in the care of Wintergreen, who grew to care very much for her and was even prepared to adopt her, though Rose ultimately joined the Teen Titans.

When Slade was later caught in an explosion, he retired and cut ties with both Pat Trayce and Wintergreen, claiming that they were no longer part of his life. Despite suspecting that this explosion actually restored Slade's memory (since details of his past life crept up in idle conversation), Wintergreen knew that Slade had his reasons for distancing himself, and thus respected this unspoken request from his student by giving him his space. In Slade's absence, Trayce and Wintergreen honoured him by continuing to run Vigilance, Inc. (a search-and-rescue operation originally set up as a mercenary organisation by Adeline).

Sometime later, Slade discovered that Joseph's spirit had taken refuge deep within his body. With the help of Wintergreen, he attempted to exorcise his son from himself, but was quickly overpowered. The possessed Slade then murdered Wintergreen, mounting his severed head on a wall as he vowed that "Deathstroke hunts alone". Before his death, Wintergreen had apparently believed that he would inevitably be murdered by Slade, evidenced by his last words, "I suppose it was only a matter of time". Slade would forever be haunted by his mentor's dying words.

Blackest Night
During the Blackest Night storyline, Wintergreen was revived by a Black Lantern Ring, and went back to haunt Deathstroke with Adeline Wilson and the Ravagers as members of the Black Lantern Corps.

DC Rebirth
Wintergreen returns in the DC Rebirth relaunch, once again serving as an ally of Deathstroke from his time in the army.

Powers and abilities
Wintergreen has received extensive training in military protocols and espionage, making him a proficient hand-to-hand combatant and martial artist. He has also proven an exceptionally skilled marksman in the use of various firearms.

In other media

Television
 Wintergreen makes occasional non-speaking appearances as Slade's butler in the Teen Titans animated series.

 Stuntman Jeffrey C. Robinson portrays Bill "Billy" Wintergreen on The CW's live-action television series Arrow. As evenly skilled in swordsmanship and hand-to-hand combat as Slade Wilson is, this version of the character is the first person in the "Arrowverse" to utilise the Deathstroke persona, and appears in the flashback scenes of season one. Bill Wintergreen (codename "Bishop") was once a member of an elite division of the Australian Secret Intelligence Service (ASIS) alongside his best friend, Slade Wilson, whose son he served as godfather. Before 2007, the pair were sent to the island of Lian Yu to rescue Chinese army deserter Yao Fei from a group of terrorists that sought to cripple China's economy. After their plane was shot down by Edward Fyers, the mercenaries' leader, Wintergreen defected to Fyers' side and left Slade to survive on his own. In the episode "Damaged", Fyers has Wintergreen torture shipwrecked playboy Oliver Queen for Yao Fei's location, only for Fei to launch a surprise attack and rescue Oliver. In "Year's End" and "Burned", Wintergreen frees Fyers from Yao Fei's capture and bests the latter in combat. In "The Odyssey", Fyers orders Wintergreen to execute a captured Oliver, but Slade triggers an explosion and engages his former partner. Although Wintergreen initially gains the upper hand, he is stabbed by Slade in his right eye. In the season eight episode "Purgatory", Team Arrow and Lyla Michaels encounter Wintergreen, Fyers, and their group on Lian Yu when the energy build-up restored them. When Lyla activates the weapon that is tied to her DNA, the energies are absorbed causing Wintergreen, Fyers, and their group to disappear.
 Wintergreen appears in the DC Universe live-action series Titans, portrayed by Demore Barnes. The series depicts Wintergreen as a younger black man who serves as Deathstroke's handler to H.I.V.E. after being part of the same Delta Force team.

Video games
In Batman: Arkham Origins, Deathstroke's profile lists William Wintergreen as one of his associates.

Web series
Wintergreen appears in Deathstroke: Knights and Dragons, voiced by Colin Salmon. This version is depicted as an aging Black British former MI6 agent.

Merchandise
DC Collectibles has released a 6.75-inch action figure of Bill Wintergreen's Deathstroke in a two-pack with Oliver Queen, based on their respective appearances in the first season of the TV show Arrow.

References

External links
 Wintergreen at the DC Database
 Deathstroke at the DC Database
 Wintergreen at the DCU Guide
 Wintergreen at Titanstower.com

DC Comics supervillains
Characters created by George Pérez
Characters created by Marv Wolfman
Comics characters introduced in 1980
DC Comics martial artists
DC Comics television characters
Fictional assassins in comics
Fictional Australian people
Fictional British people
Fictional butlers
Fictional mercenaries in comics
Fictional murderers
Fictional Special Air Service personnel
Fictional swordfighters in comics
Fictional torturers
Fictional Vietnam War veterans